I'm Alive is a solo album released by Night Ranger's drummer Kelly Keagy. Released in 2007 on Frontiers Records, it features Jim Peterik, Reb Beach, and Michael Lardie.

Track listing
 "I'm Alive" - 4:36
 "Stolen" - 4:36
 "Blink of an Eye" - 5:25
 "When Nobody's Looking" - 4:01
 "Back of Your Mind" - 6:29 *1
 "Life Worth Remembering" - 4:20 *1
 "Re-Imagine" - 4:48 *2
 "World Before and After" - 4:38
 "Where Are We Now" - 2:10
 "Where the Road Ends" - 4:03 *1
 "Everything I Need in a Woman" - 4:42
 "Call in Another Day" - 5:43
 "Half a World Away" - 5:45
 "Life Worth Remembering" (acoustic, Japanese release [KICP-1226] bonus track) - 4:20

All songs written by Kelly Keagy and Jim Peterik, except:
1 Kelly Keagy, Jim Peterik, Bruce Gaitisch
2 Kelly Keagy, Jim Peterik, Michael Lardie

Personnel
Kelly Keagy - lead and backing vocals, drums, percussion, guitar, producer, mixing
Jim Peterik - guitar, bass, keyboards, backing vocals, producer, mixing
Reb Beach, Mike Aquino, Brian Bart, Bruce Gaitsch, Tommy Denander - guitars
Michael Lardie - keyboards, engineer
Mike Behymer - keyboards
George Hawkins - bass
Kent Slucher - drums

References

2006 albums
Kelly Keagy albums
Frontiers Records albums